The 2021 Rugby League World Cup knockout stage may refer to:
 2021 Men's Rugby League World Cup knockout stage
 2021 Women's Rugby League World Cup knockout stage
 2021 Wheelchair Rugby League World Cup knockout stage
 2021 Physical Disability Rugby League World Cup knockout stage

See also 
 2021 Rugby League World Cup (disambiguation)